Below is a list of notable footballers who have played for Palermo Football Club. Generally, this means players that have played 100 or more league matches for the club. However, some players who have played fewer matches are also included; this includes players that have had considerable success at Italian top flight or European level with other clubs, club record holders, and players who have appeared at least once in the FIFA World Cup, or regulars who appeared with a national team during their stay with the club.

Players are listed according to the date of their first-team debut for the club. Appearances and goals are for first-team competitive domestic league matches only; wartime and playoff matches are excluded. Substitute appearances included. Statistics correct as of June 10, 2007.

Key
 GK — Goalkeeper
 DF — Defender
 MF — Midfielder
 FW — Forward

Nationalities are indicated by the corresponding FIFA country code.

Sources
Channel 4: Palermo All-Time XI
 Cuore Rosanero
 Repubblica.it - Palermo edition article
 RSSSF: Sicilian teams in Serie A
 RSSSF: Sicilian teams in Serie B

Players
U.S. Citta di Palermo players
Palermo
Association football player non-biographical articles